"Together We Two" is a song released by The Archies, a fictional bubblegum pop band from the Archie Comics universe in 1970.  It was written by Jeff Barry and Andy Kim.  It failed to chart the Billboard Hot 100 peaking at No. 22 on the U.S. Bubbling Under Singles chart.

Charts

References

The Archies songs
1970 singles
1970 songs
Songs written by Jeff Barry
Songs written by Andy Kim